The World of Donovan may refer to:

 The World of Donovan (1969 album)
 The World of Donovan (1972 album)